The arrano beltza (Basque, 'black eagle'; it is also the Basque name of the golden eagle, Aquila chrysaetos) is an ancient Basque and Navarre symbol depicting a black heraldic eagle upon a yellow background.  Today, it is mostly used by Basque nationalists as a symbol of sovereignty and independence.

History 

The black eagle was originally the seal of King Sancho VII of Navarre but was later attributed to Sancho III of Navarre who, when incorporating Aragon and Castile, had under his crown all the territories of Basque culture and language, including those traditionally Castilian, since his kingdom reached from Galicia to Ribagorça. From a Basque nationalist interpretation, the rule of Sancho III constitutes a historical precedent for the aspirations of the unification of the Basque-speaking territories under one independent State. From a Spanish perspective, it is one of the first attempts at forming a unified Spain.

Note that the flag is a modern interpretation of the seal.
There are no known flags prior to the 18th century when Father Isla describes a crimson flag with the chains and crown of the modern coat-of-arms.

Usage 
This symbol is used mostly by the so-called Ezker Abertzalea (Basque leftists). However, it is occasionally used by Spanish nationalists.
Some Spanish nationalist organisations of neo-fascist character (specifically the AUN), have on a few occasions used the arrano beltza as well, presenting it as a symbol of Spanish unity. For this idea, they allege that Sancho III ruled most of Christian Spain, from León to Barcelona, and that he was cited as Rex Hispanorum Regum, that is, "King of the Kings of the Hispanians".

Songs
Arrano beltza is also a song by Basque songwriter Mikel Laboa (later covered by rock band Negu Gorriak), including the verses:

It alludes to a legend about the origin of the coat of arms and flag of Navarre.

Notes 

Basque culture
Flags of Spain
Navarre culture
Flags of indigenous peoples
Heraldic eagles